Pagryžuvys Manor is a former residential manor in Pagryžuvys village, Kelmė District Municipality, Lithuania, on the right shore of Gryžuva.

Gallery

References

Manor houses in Lithuania
Kelmė District Municipality